Scrobipalpa bryophiloides is a moth of the family Gelechiidae. It is found in eastern Europe, from Finland and Latvia through Ukraine to the Volga region and the southern Ural. It is also found from Turkey to the Middle East, Central Asia (Turkmenistan, Uzbekistan, Kazakhstan, Iran), China (Inner Mongolia, Ningxia, Shaanxi, Xinjiang) and Mongolia.

The forewings are brown-yellowish with groups of paler scales between the three black dots and at the tip. The hindwings are grey-whitish.

The larvae feed on Suaeda confusa. They possibly mine the leaves of their host plant.

References

Moths described in 1966
Scrobipalpa
Moths of Europe
Moths of Asia